Satria Adikarta Football Club (simply known as Satria Adikarta or PS Satria Adikarta) is an Indonesian football club based in Kulon Progo Regency, Special Region of Yogyakarta. They currently compete in the Liga 3.

Honours
 Liga 3 Special Region of Yogyakarta
 Champion: 2017

References

External links

Kulon Progo Regency
Football clubs in Indonesia
Football clubs in the Special Region of Yogyakarta